Wyoming Highway 371 (WYO 371) is a  north-south Wyoming State Road in Sweetwater County that provides travel to the old coal mining town of Superior.

Route description
Wyoming Highway 371 begins its southern end at exit 122 of Interstate 80/U.S. Route 30 south of Superior. From there, WYO 371 travels north and passes through the town of Superior between Mileposts 6.78 and 7.16. Not long after, Wyoming Highway 371 ends after 7.3 miles at Upper Superior Road.

Major intersections

References

External links 

Wyoming State Routes 300-399
Wyoming Highway 371
Superior, WY - Ghosttowns.com

Transportation in Sweetwater County, Wyoming
371